Pipistrellus bat coronavirus HKU5 (Bat-CoV HKU5) is an enveloped, positive-sense single-stranded RNA mammalian Group 2 Betacoronavirus discovered in Japanese Pipistrellus in Hong Kong. This strain of coronavirus is closely related to the newly identified novel MERS-CoV that is responsible for the 2012 Middle East respiratory syndrome-related coronavirus outbreaks in Saudi Arabia, Jordan, United Arab Emirates, the United Kingdom, France, and Italy.

Transmission
The exact means of transmission to humans is not yet well known. However, it has been demonstrated that betaCoV's including HKU5 have the propensity to recombine and cause interspecies transmission. However, this is not seen in Group C betaCov's to which MERS-CoV is most closely related.

See also
 London1 novel CoV/2012
 Severe acute respiratory syndrome

References

External links
  London1-nCoV-2012 phylogenetic tree
 Coronaviruses
 Viralzone: Betacoronavirus
 Virus Pathogen Database and Analysis Resource (ViPR): Coronaviridae

Merbecovirus
Bat virome
Animal viral diseases
Bat diseases